Roque Estrada Reynoso. Lawyer, journalist, writer. Born in Moyahua, Zacatecas on August 16, 1883. His parents were José Camilo Estrada Haro and Micaela Reynoso Espitia. His younger brother was Enrique Estrada. He organized workers in a socialist party in Guadalajara in 1904. He completed his law degree at the University of Guadalajara in 1906. He participated in the presidential campaign of Francisco I. Madero in 1909, as a Member of the Anti-Reelectionist Center. He was jailed with Francisco I. Madero in San Luis Potosí, in 1909. Later, he became the provisional Secretary to Francisco I. Madero in 1910, when he returned to Mexico. He was also the Private Secretary to Venustiano Carranza in 1914. He was appointed the Commanding Officer of the 2nd Cavalry Brigade, Western Division from 1914 to 1915, and he obtained the rank of Brigadier General. He was Provisional Governor of Aguascalientes in 1915. From 1915 to 1916, he was named Secretary of Justice. He was candidate for president of Mexico against General Álvaro Obregón, in 1920.
  
He was federal deputy from the State of Zacatecas, 1920-22. He joined his brother Enrique Estrada in 1923 in support of the Adolfo de la Huerta rebellion. As a result, he was in exiled to the United States in 1923 and 1927-29. He was the Secretary of Press and Publicity of the CEN of Institutional Revolutionary Party (Spanish: Partido Revolucionario Institucional or PRI), June 19, 1935. In 1942 he was judge and then president of the Supreme Court of Justice of the Nation (Suprema Corte de Justicia de la Nación), in 1952. In 1957 he was honored with the Belisario Domínguez Medal of the Senate (Medalla Belisario Domínguez del Senado de la República), the highest decoration that the Mexican Senate gives to the most eminent citizens. He died in Mexico City on November 27, 1966.

Chief Justices Supreme Court of Justice of the Nation
Chief Justice (Suprema Corte de Justicia de la Nación) under the 1917 Constitution:

 1941–1951: Salvador Urbina
 1952: Roque Estrada Reynoso
 1953: Hilario Medina

Books
La Revolución y Francisco I. Madero. Primero, segunda y tercera etapas. Guadalajara: Imprenta americana, Marzo de 1912.
Momento psicologico. Mexico, 1914. (Written during March and April, 1914, while in prison in Mexico.--cf. p. 62.)
Tema desarrollado en el teatro : arbeu, la noche del 22 de Mayo de 1916, en la velada con motivo de la repartición de socorros a los heridos en campaña: nuestros problemas. México: Andrés Botas, 1916
Concentración antibolchevique. México: Imprenta I. Escalante, 1923.
... Liberación, novela histórica-contemporánea. Portada de Ernesto García Cabral.  México: Editorial "Cvltvra", 1933. (A series of articles originally appearing in Excelsior, Dec. 18-19, 1922 and Jan. 2-29, 1923)
... Idiota, novela. México: Ediciones Botas, 1935.

Sources
 Estrada Reynoso, Roque. In: Mexican Political Biographies, 1935-1993. By Roderic Ai Camp, Austin: University of Texas Press, 1995: 223-224.
 Estrada Reynoso, Roque. In: Historical dictionary of Mexico. By Donald C. Briggs, Marvin Álisky, Metuchen, N.J.: Scarecrow Press, 1981: 77.

External links
 Prominent Personalities Of The Mexican Revolution 1910-1928
Medalla Belisario Domínguez del Senado de la República
Picture political Discourse

Mexican journalists
Male journalists
20th-century Mexican judges
Mexican male writers
People from Zacatecas
1883 births
1966 deaths
Presidents of the Supreme Court of Justice of the Nation
20th-century journalists